The John B. Connally Turf Cup is a Grade III American Thoroughbred horse race, for four-year-olds and older over a distance of one and one-half miles (12 furlongs) on the turf track, held annually in late January or early February at Sam Houston Race Park in Houston, Texas. The event currently carries a purse of $200,000.

History
One of Sam Houston Race Park's most prestigious races is named in honor of former Texas governor John B. Connally (1917–1993) who was long time supporter and lobbied for the horse racing industry in Texas.

The inaugural running of the event was on 21 October 1995 as the John B. Connally Jr. Turf Cup Handicap for horses three-years-old or older over a distance of  miles and was won by Temple Webber Junior's Marastani by  lengths in a time of 1:51.25.

The following year 1990 and until 2008, the Breeders' Cup sponsored the event which reflected in the name of the event. In 1997 the event was moved from October to early April.

The event was upgraded in 2006 by the American Graded Stakes Committee to a Grade III race. In 2009 the event was not held.

In 2011 the event was moved to a January schedule and the conditions were changed to allow only four-year-olds and older. The following year the event's conditions were changed from a handicap to a stakes with allowances with the name of the event modified to the John B. Connally Turf Cup Stakes.

In 2016 the distance of the event was increased to  miles.

The event is one of only two graded stakes races held at the track along with the Grade III Houston Ladies Classic. Along with the Ladies Classic, Pulse Power Turf Sprint and Bob Bork Texas Turf Mile, the John B. Connally Turf Cup is one of the main events of the Houston Racing Festival.

Records

Speed record:
 miles: 1:47.65 – Chorwon  (1999)
 miles: 2:28.16 – Da Big Hoss (2016)

Margins:
 lengths – Da Big Hoss (2016)

Most wins:
 3 – Candid Glen (2001, 2002, 2003) 
 3 – Bigger Picture (2017, 2018, 2019)

Most wins by a jockey:
 3 – Robby Albarado (2000, 2006, 2010)
 3 – Elvis J. Perrodin (2001, 2002, 2003)
 3 – José Ortiz (2017, 2018, 2019)

Most wins by a trainer:
 7 – Michael J. Maker (2012, 2014, 2015, 2016, 2017, 2018, 2019)

Most wins by an owner:
 3 – Glen C. Warren (2001, 2002, 2003) 
 3 – Three Diamonds Farm (2017, 2018, 2019)

Winners

Legend:

See also
 List of American and Canadian Graded races

External links
2022 Sam Houston Stakes Schedule

References

Sam Houston Race Park
Horse races in Texas
Grade 3 stakes races in the United States
Recurring sporting events established in 1995
Sports in Houston
1995 establishments in Texas
Turf races in the United States
Open middle distance horse races